Wendefurth is a hamlet in central Germany that, since 1 July 2009, has been part of the borough of Thale district of Harz. Previously it belonged to the municipality of Altenbrak which was incorporated into Thale.

Geographical location 
The hamlet, which consists of just a few houses, lies in the Harz mountains in the deeply incised Bode Gorge on the B 81 federal road and was named after a ford that crossed the River Bode. The Harz Witches' Path (Harzer Hexenstieg) passes nearby.

Points of interest 
Wendefurth Dam
Wendefurth Power Station

Villages in the Harz
Thale